In biology, a phagolysosome, or endolysosome, is a cytoplasmic body formed by the fusion of a phagosome with a lysosome in a process that occurs during phagocytosis. Formation of phagolysosomes is essential for the intracellular destruction of microorganisms and pathogens. It takes place when the phagosome's and lysosome's membranes 'collide', at which point the lysosomal contents—including hydrolytic enzymes—are discharged into the phagosome in an explosive manner and digest the particles that the phagosome had ingested. Some products of the digestion are useful materials and are moved into the cytoplasm; others are exported by exocytosis.

Membrane fusion of the phagosome and lysosome is regulated by the Rab5 protein, a G protein that allows the exchange of material between these two organelles but prevents complete fusion of their membranes.

Function 
Phagolysosomes function by reducing the pH of their internal environment thus making them acidic. This serves as a defense mechanism against microbes and other harmful parasites and also provides a suitable medium for degradative enzyme activity.

Microbes are destroyed within phagolysosomes by a combination of oxidative and non-oxidative processes. The oxidative process also known as respiratory burst includes the "non-mitochondrial" production of reactive oxygen species.

By lowering pH and concentrations of sources of carbon and nitrogen, phagolysomes inhibit growth of fungi. An example is the inhibition of hyphae in Candida albicans.

In human neutrophils, the phagolysosomes destroy pathogens also by producing hypochlorous acid.

Pathogens that hijack phagolysosomes 
Coxiella burnetii, the causative agent of Q fever, thrives and replicates in the acidic phagolysosomes of its host cell. The acidity of the phagolysosome is essential for C.burnetii to transport glucose, glutamate, and proline, as well as for its synthesis of nucleic acids and proteins.

Similarly, when in its amastigote stage, Leishmania obtains all its purine sources, various vitamins, and a number of its essential amino acids from the phagolysosome of its host. Leishmania also obtain heme from the proteolysis of proteins in the host phagolysosome .

References 

Organelles